Xango, LLC, (sometimes stylized as XANGO and XanGo) was a privately owned Lehi, Utah-based multi-level marketing company founded in 2002. It was acquired by Zija International in May 2017. The company marketed and distributed Xango juice, a blended juice product consisting of mangosteen and other juices, and skin care, personal care, energy supplement and nutritional supplement products. The company was warned in 2006 by the FDA for illegally marketing more than 20 human health benefits for Xango juice.

Company overview

Executives
Gary Hollister, Founder, Chairman Emeritus, former Chief Executive, former Chairman of the Board
Aaron Garrity, Founder, Chairman of the Board, CEO, former President
Joe Morton, Founder, Board of Directors  
Gordon Morton, Founder, Board of Directors
Kent Wood, Founder, Board of Directors

Revenue
Xango was a privately held company and as such did not publicly disclose its financial statements. Company press releases in 2005-2006 stated that sales totaled $40 million in 2003 and $150 million in 2004, and that 2005 sales were more than twice those of 2004. In October 2007 the company said that cumulative sales since its inception five years earlier were over $1 billion and by November 2008 had exceeded $1.5 billion.

In December 2012, Direct Selling News reported that Xango concluded its first ten years of operation in November 2012 with sales operations in 43 countries, 27 office locations, 49 distribution centers, more than two million distributors, and about $2 billion in cumulative revenues. Xango's revenues and annual reports have fueled much public and legal speculation that it is a pyramid scheme.

Financial sponsorships and contributions
In November 2006, Xango, LLC, became the official corporate jersey-front sponsor of Real Salt Lake, an MLS soccer team based in Salt Lake City, Utah, for four years, at a cost of between $500,000 and $1 million per year. Xango's contract with Real Salt Lake ended after the 2013 season. In 2006, the company made a 5-year, $1 million grant to an Orem, Utah arts council for naming rights to what is now called the "Xango Grand Theater".
Xango, LLC, has been the top contributor to the political campaign of Utah Senator Orrin Hatch, contributing $47,200 in 2008 and $46,700 in 2006, according to OpenSecrets.

Product overview

Products and distribution
Xango (pronounced "ZAN-go") is the common name of the company, XanGo LLC, as well as its first and flagship juice product (also often called Xango Juice).  It also has other products in the personal care and wellness industry.

Xango Juice is sold in the U.S. and (as of late-2011) exported to Australia, Canada, Germany, Japan, Malaysia, Mexico, Singapore, Sweden, and the United Kingdom. The company began operating in Taiwan as of October 2007.

The company's business model is direct sales via multi-level marketing rather than retail sales, mainly using a nine-level multi-level marketing structure. In June 2006, the company said it had 350,000 distributors.  In July, the company told the Federal Trade Commission that there were "roughly 500,000 distributors worldwide", and in November, it reported having more than 600 employees at its Lehi headquarters and more than 500,000 independent distributors in 15 international markets.  In July 2007, it said it had about 700,000 distributors, of whom an estimated 70 percent simply use their status to buy the juice at the discounted membership price. In October 2008, it said that it operated in 24 countries and had more than 1 million independent distributors. As of 2013, the company stated that it operated in 43 countries.

In the United States, Xango Juice sells for a retail price of $37.50 for a 750 ml (25.35 ounce) bottle.  Purchasing through Xango's distributor group, juice and other products can be bought at wholesale prices.  Xango also sells Reserve, a more expensive version of its original juice product with a higher mangosteen content.

In 2009, Xango launched Glimpse Skin Care, products made using undefined quantities of mangosteen. The Glimpse product line includes Luminescence Collection, Mineral Treatment, and Mangosteen Oils. The company's Juni line of personal care products includes shampoos, conditioners, skin lotion, bar and body soaps.

Xango also sells various dietary supplements including 3SIXTY5 and 3SIXTY5 for Kids multivitamins; Precis Men's Health, Omega-3, and Rest & Renew; Favao weight control products (body cleanse, fiber, and various protein supplements) -- which, according to the company, include mangosteen components as ingredients—and Eleviv capsules, which contain four herbal ingredients.

Xango Juice composition
Xango Juice is a blend of mangosteen aril and pericarp purée with juice concentrates of eight other fruits: apple, pear (juice and purée), grape, blueberry, raspberry, strawberry, cranberry and cherry. Other ingredients include citric acid, natural flavor, pectin, xanthan gum, sodium benzoate, and potassium sorbate.  Xango claims its juice contains xanthonoid compounds from the mangosteen pericarp.

Associated Press commissioned the Linus Pauling Institute to measure the in vitro antioxidant strength of Xango Juice against retail fruit juices. The antioxidant strength of XanGo Juice measured slightly higher than cranberry juice but lower than black cherry and less than half the value for blueberry juice. However, the value of in vitro analysis of antioxidant strength is questionable, as there is no current evidence that antioxidant phytochemicals present in Xango or other fruit juices actually have functions inside the human body. The measurements of antioxidant strength apply to test tubes, but consumed juices are affected by stomach acids that would neutralize or destroy antioxidant value preventing the same biological effects in vivo.

In 2002, Xango founders Aaron Garrity, Gordon Morton, and Joseph Morton (doing business as DBC, LLC) applied for a United States patent (#6730333) for Xango Juice; however the application was rejected by the United States Patent and Trademark Office on April 21, 2005. On November 3, 2008,  the U.S. Court of Appeals for the Federal Circuit ruled that the decision of a patent appeals board to deny Xango's patent application would still stand.

False advertising claims

Pericarp xanthones and potential health effects
According to a 2006 warning by the US Food and Drug Administration, XanGo's distributors had illegally used marketing materials to promote mangosteen juice claiming more than 20 human health benefits, including "anti-inflammatory," "anti-microbial," "anti-fungal," "anti-viral," "anti-cancer," "anti-ulcer," "anti-hepatotoxic," "anti-rhinoviral," and "anti-allergic" effects. Promotional literature for the product cites antioxidants from the inedible pericarp of the fruit as providing health benefits. None of these claims, however, has scientific proof established by peer-reviewed research and human clinical trials, as discussed below.

The American Cancer Society profile of mangosteen juice states there is no reliable evidence that mangosteen juice, purée, or bark is effective as a cancer treatment in humans.  As of April 2013, it also states that the mangosteen "fruit has been shown to be rich in anti-oxidants. Very early laboratory studies suggest it may have promise as a topical treatment for acne. Early small laboratory and animal studies suggest that further research should be done to determine whether it can help to prevent cancer in humans."

Pericarp xanthones remain under preliminary research to define their potential properties, which may include antioxidant and chemopreventive effects. In 2007, the Mayo Clinic stated there was laboratory evidence that mangosteen xanthones had anti-inflammatory activity, but there was no evidence demonstrating such anti-inflammatory effects in humans. The Mayo Clinic has since confirmed there is still no conclusive evidence of effectiveness.

In 2009, XanGo scientific adviser, David Morton, participated in a four-part debate on the asserted claims of mangosteen health benefits.

U.S. FDA warning
On September 20, 2006, the United States Food and Drug Administration issued a warning letter to Xango LLC International in response to the company's promotion of Xango juice as an aid to treat and/or cure various diseases.  The agency's letter warned that Xango juice had not been properly tested for safety and efficacy, and as a proposed new drug, it could not be legally sold in the U.S. without prior approval of the FDA. Xango was warned that it could face enforcement action including seizure and/or injunction of products or suspension of business. Under FDA drug labeling rules, Xango, as manufacturer, is responsible for satisfying scientific criteria to make health claims on its product labels and all marketing materials. As of September 2008, the case remained open.

Effectiveness
The Mayo Clinic said in October 2005 that "there are no published clinical trials showing evidence that either the fruit or its juice – marketed under the name Xango juice – is an effective treatment for arthritis, cancer or any other disorder in humans." In 2011 the Mayo Clinic reiterated that "it is still too early to say for sure what role mangosteen juice has in treating arthritis symptoms."

In February 2006, the U.C. Berkeley Wellness Newsletter, sponsored by the University of California at Berkeley, said that "Mangosteen marketers make farfetched and unsubstantiated claims for their products." The newsletter notes that "there are no clinical trials, and what happens in a test tube or animal may not occur in a human. Any reported benefits in humans have been anecdotal. No one even knows if the processed fruit juice and capsules retain the potentially beneficial compounds. What’s more, the juice is typically a mix of fruit juices – with an undisclosed amount of mangosteen in it."

Ralph Moss, an alternative cancer treatment advocate, has said of mangosteen juice:

A 2008 medical case report described a patient with severe acidosis possibly attributable to a year of daily use (to lose weight, dose not described) of mangosteen juice (brand not described) infused with xanthonoids, as occurs in the manufacture of Xango juice. The authors proposed that chronic exposure to alpha-mangostin, a xanthone, could be toxic to mitochondrial function, leading to impairment of cellular respiration and production of lactic acidosis.

Italian antitrust action

In 2011 Italy's antitrust and consumer protection authority, the AGCM, suspended the activities of Xango in response to over-broad health claims, as well as possible violations of pyramid scheme laws.

Litigation

Tahitian Noni International
Tahitian Noni International (TNI), a rival MLM beverage company, sued Xango, LLC, and several of its top executives in February 2003 in the 4th District Court in Provo, Utah, alleging that Xango executives stole TNI's concept for a mangosteen-based supplement while they were employed by TNI's parent-company. After a countersuit against TNI was launched by Xango, LLC, the two parties settled out of court. A joint statement by TNI and Xango said that they had "agreed to resolve their disputes and the litigation between them and their founders" but the particulars of the settlement were not disclosed.

Mismanagement allegations
In 2009, the Utah Supreme Court allowed a Xango investor to proceed with a lawsuit that alleges corporate looting and mismanagement of millions of dollars by the Lehi supplements company's founders for their personal expenses including luxury cars and performance-enhancing medical treatments. The Utah Supreme Court overturned a 4th District Court ruling that dismissed a lawsuit filed in 2007 by Angel Investors LLC alleging Xango's founders took millions of dollars in personal loans from the company and paid themselves excessive salaries while wasting corporate assets. In 2010 XanGo settled with Angel Investors for an undisclosed amount of money. "Angel Investors, who had owned no more than 1 percent of the Lehi company, had charged in three lawsuits in Utah County that the founders deprived them of some of the return on their investment. The group cited such expenditures as $6,000 monthly auto allowances, family vacations and, in one case, $20,000 worth of home furnishings." The terms of the settlement were not disclosed.

In 2013 Xango founder Bryan Davis filed a lawsuit accusing his partners of spying, threatening employees, falsifying distributor positions to siphon off funds, defrauding on Xango taxes and their personal taxes, falsifying records, changing credit card statements, charging as business expenses to purchase grand pianos, vacations, home renovations, landscaping, electronics, expensive bicycles, scooters, and for CEO Aaron Garrity, an open expense account for one mistress.

According to the lawsuit, Garrity embezzled hundreds of thousands of dollars in assets from the company, writing off clothing, medical enhancements, jewelry, event tickets, bicycles, electronics and chartered planes and vacations as business expenses. CFO Nate Brown set up secret founder accounts for Garrity and others to allow them to improperly spend Xango assets.

Davis also alleges in the lawsuit that Garrity's assistant, Andrea Waterfall, with whom he was in a relationship, had a company credit card that she used for personal expenses, and that Garrity sent in fraudulent expense reports.

Other allegations include Garrity using power and influence as a founder to threaten Xango employees into turning a blind eye to his theft and instituting what he termed a “culture of giving” at Xango meaning that founders and employees Garrity determined were in his good graces could use an unlimited amount of Xango assets for their personal benefit.

The lawsuit further reports founders are alleged to have used Xango employment and forced qualified distributor positions to siphon Xango assets to family members and friends.

Davis alleges the founders conspired to give themselves illicit distributions through a tax fraud scheme and that the founders also formed various competing companies with Xango assets. He is also claiming that the founders took steps to freeze him out of the company — ignoring Davis’ objections to wrongful conduct, falsifying board minutes to reflect unanimous consent to actions to which he had voiced objections, Xango employees were told not to talk to Davis under penalty of termination, that founders also falsely claimed to Xango employees that he had resigned his position at Xango and disparaged him. As a result, Davis said Xango withheld bonus/distribution payments to Davis as well as discontinuing employee benefits.

The lawsuit further states that Garrity has also misused Xango's security department to retaliate against Davis, Angel, leaders and founders of competing MLMs and Xango distributors and employee, according to the suit; Garrity allegedly asked Justin Barrett to use his access to law enforcement databases to find information on these individuals that was not on public record, which information Garrity could then use to his advantage. He also requested that the Xango security department obtain non-traceable wireless accounts for him for the purpose of online corporate intelligence gathering, dissemination of information and posting defamatory comments about competitors, distributors, employees and others. A bogus account was illegally created under the fictitious name “John Gable.”

The Xango board's attorney said the accusations are fabricated because Davis is attempting to extract an inflated buyout from them for his shares in the company. Benevento said several months ago, the Xango board offered Davis a separation agreement due to his ongoing failure to fulfill his responsibilities and that Davis has failed to show up for work yet still expects a regular paycheck.

Garrity's attorney refuted the claim, saying the allegations are to help Davis inflate his share holdings for a greater profit.

Also in 2013, Xango filed an action against Bryan Davis in the Third Judicial District Court (Utah and Salt Lake City) refuting Mr Davis' claims in his lawsuit and claiming that Mr Davis was negligent in his duties. Xango settled these cases ultimately, out of court for an undisclosed amount.

Taxation issues

In 2012 Xango had issues concerning taxes. "At the top of 2012 tax delinquency lists was $347,816 owed for the Lehi headquarters of Xango, a multilevel marketing company that sells nutritional supplements — which has its name on the uniforms of Real Salt Lake soccer players. That property is owned by Thai Properties, which is part of the same corporate group as Xango, said Nate Brown, chief financial officer for Xango".

See also
List of ineffective cancer treatments

References 

Companies based in Utah County, Utah
Privately held companies based in Utah
Companies established in 2002
Multi-level marketing companies based in Utah
2002 establishments in Utah
Pseudoscience
2017 mergers and acquisitions